The 2012 Copa de Fútbol Femenino de Euskal Herria was the second edition of this competition organized by the Basque Country Football Federation, featuring eleven clubs from Euskadi and Navarra playing in Primera and Segunda plus a Northern Basque Country selection. It ran from May 2 to August 26, 2012.

Real Sociedad defeated defending champion Athletic Bilbao in the final, played in Beasain, to win the competition for the first time. Añorga KKE and SD Lagunak also reached the semifinals.

Results

First round
The matches were played on 2 May, 4 and 16 June 2012.

|}

Quarter-finals
The matches were played on 15, 19 and 21 August 2012.

|}

Semifinals
The matches were played on 22 and 23 August 2012.

|}

Final

References

2011–12 in Spanish football cups
Bas